The statue of Baphomet is a bronze sculpture commissioned by The Satanic Temple depicting Baphomet, a winged, goat-headed, humanoid and a symbol of the occult. Petitions to display the piece on public grounds have resulted in arguments concerning the separation of church and state. Production of the statue, and its initial notoriety, is featured in the documentary Hail Satan? (2019).

Origins
The Satanic Temple began an Indiegogo crowdfunding campaign in 2014 to create a satanic monument depicting Baphomet and two children, with the intention to display this monument at the Oklahoma State Capitol. The group's fundraising efforts aimed at erecting the statue in response to the Ten Commandments Monument installed by Oklahoma State Representative Mike Ritze in 2012.  Artist Mark Porter created the sculpture in Florida using the drawing by Eliphas Levi as a basis for Baphomet.

Public unveiling
The piece was first seen publicly on 25 July 2015 at an event organized by the Detroit chapter of The Satanic Temple, amidst protests by religious organizations. The 700 attendees at the unveiling ceremony had to "sell their souls to Satan" in order to receive a ticket, a tactic that the Temple stated was done in order to "keep away some of the more radical superstitious people who would try to undermine the event."

Time noted that "the group does not 'promote a belief in a personal Satan.' By their logic, Satan is an abstraction, ... 'a literary figure, not a deity — he stands for rationality, for skepticism, for speaking truth to power, even at great personal cost.' Time also commented on the statue's unveiling, writing "Call it Libertarian Gothic, maybe — some darker permutation of Ayn Rand's crusade for free will. One witnesses in The Satanic Temple militia a certain knee-jerk reaction to encroachments upon personal liberties, especially when those encroachments come with a crucifix in hand. The Baphomet statue is the Satanic Temple’s defiant retort du jour."

State Capitol grounds

Oklahoma
Initially commissioned to be installed alongside the Ten Commandments outside the Oklahoma State Capitol, The Satanic Temple offered to donate Baphomet for display on the Capitol grounds.  After litigation of Prescott v. Oklahoma Capitol Preservation Commission concluded with a State Supreme Court order to remove the Ten Commandments monument, the Satanic Temple withdrew their request to place Baphomet on Oklahoma public property.

Arkansas
The statue was displayed on a flatbed truck parked in front of the Arkansas State Capitol building for several hours on 16 August 2018 for an event organized in protest of the Ten Commandments Monument on the Arkansas Capitol grounds. After a formal request to install Baphomet was refused, in violation of the Equal Protection Clause, Satanic Temple members were granted legal standing to challenge the Ten Commandments monument.

References in popular culture 
The Satanic Temple sued Netflix in November 2018 over usage of a likeness of the statue in Chilling Adventures of Sabrina. The case was settled out of court for an undisclosed sum and The Satanic Temple being given credit for the statue in future broadcasts.

See also

 2015 in art
 Sigil of Baphomet

References

External links
 Decoding the symbols on Satan's statue BBC News
2015 sculptures
Bronze sculptures in the United States
Demons in art
Goats in art
Sculptures in Michigan
Sculptures of children in the United States
Sculptures of deities
Statues in the United States
Religion and politics
Indiegogo projects